Martin Stanford (born 2 May 1958) is an English journalist and former news presenter for Sky News, having worked for the channel from 1991 to 2016. He was the first British newsreader to announce the death of Diana, Princess of Wales, and presented a number of different programmes on Sky News over the years, including Sunrise, Sky News at Ten and Sky News Today. Stanford also devised and presented SkyNews.com, a programme which focused on the top stories across the Internet, between 2007 and 2010.

Until early 2016, Stanford presented Sky News on Saturday mornings from 10am to 12pm, including the slot #digitalview, which looked at the news from a technological standpoint. He also presented the Sky News Debate America, a weekly programme discussing American issues with two US-based pundits.

In April 2016, Stanford announced his departure from Sky News, after having worked at the channel for more than 25 years. During December 2016 Martin was covering shows over the Christmas schedules on  LBC Radio  

In January 2017 he was seen on TRT World, an English-language channel based in Turkey, presenting a programme called Insight. He  left TRT when the Insight programme was replaced by Roundtable, presented by David Foster and Matthew Moore, and subsequently did some presenting on the BBC News channel.

Stanford joined Global Media & Entertainment as a presenter on the new LBC News Radio station, when it launched in the UK on 28 October 2019. He is the anchor presenter for the 10am to 1pm slot, following the breakfast show of Lisa Aziz.

References 

British television newsreaders and news presenters
English reporters and correspondents
English television presenters
Living people
Sky News newsreaders and journalists
1958 births